Legislative elections were held in Taiwan on 11 January 2020 for all 113 seats to the Legislative Yuan concurrently with the 15th presidential election. The term of the Legislative Yuan began on 1 February 2020. 

The Democratic Progressive Party (DPP) lost seven seats but retained a majority of 61 seats in the Legislative Yuan. The Kuomintang gained three seats, winning 38. The New Power Party won three seats, down from five in the last election. The Taiwan People's Party and Taiwan Statebuilding Party entered the Legislative Yuan with five seats and one seat, respectively, with five independent candidates winning their seats and the People First Party losing all of their seats.

Electoral system

Members were elected by parallel voting. 73 members were elected by first-past-the-post, 6 reserved for indigenous candidates by single non-transferable vote, and 34 by party-list proportional representation.

Constituency changes 
In 2019, after negotiations between the Presidents of the Executive and Legislative Yuans, changes to the electoral divisions include:
Kaoshiung and Pingtung each lost a seat.
Tainan and Hsinchu County each gained a seat.
The boundary between Taichung II and Taichung VII was adjusted.

Contesting parties and candidates

Opinion polling

Results

By constituency

Aboriginal constituencies

See also
Legislative Yuan constituencies

Notes

References

Taiwan
Legislative election
Taiwan
Legislative elections in Taiwan